Legacies of the Turf: A Century of Great Thoroughbred Breeders is a biographical book written by Thoroughbred horse racing historian Edward L. Bowen and published by Eclipse Press on November 25, 2003.

Legacies of the Turf was named "Sports Book of the Year" in 2003 by Foreword Reviews Book of the Year Awards (now known as the Foreword INDIES).

In addition to the twenty chapters on the people and/or specific breeding operations, there is a section devoted to foundation mares.

Chapters
James R. Keene
John E. Madden
August Belmont Jr.
William Collins Whitney & Harry Payne Whitney
Arthur B. Hancock Sr.
William Woodward Sr.
Greentree Stud (Helen Hay Whitney)
Samuel D. Riddle & Walter M. Jeffords Sr.
Col E. R. Bradley
Hal Price Headley
Wheatley Stable
Mereworth Farm
Joseph E. Widener & George D. Widener Jr.
Calumet Farm
John Hay Whitney &  Joan Whitney Payson
Brookmeade Stable
Cornelius Vanderbilt Whitney
Bieber-Jacobs Stable
Alfred G. Vanderbilt II
Arthur B. Hancock Jr.

References

 Legacies of the Turf at Eclipse Press
 Review by About.com, a part of The New York Times Company

2003 non-fiction books
Non-fiction books about horse racing
American biographies
History of horse racing